Jure Pavlič (born 23 April 1963) is a Yugoslav former cyclist. He competed in the individual road race event at the 1984 Summer Olympics. He also finished in 5th place in the Young Rider Classification, in a tie for 3rd place in the King of the Mountains competition and won the Intergiro competition ahead of Laurent Fignon during the 1989 Giro d'Italia.

Major results
1984
 3rd Overall Tour of Yugoslavia
1985
 1st Overall Tour of Yugoslavia
 1st Stage 1 Tour of Austria
1986
 1st Overall Tour of Yugoslavia
 2nd Giro del Belvedere
1988
 1st Gran Premio Palio del Recioto
 1st Stage 2 Tour of Austria
1989
 1st  Intergiro classification Giro d'Italia

References

External links
 

1963 births
Living people
Yugoslav male cyclists
Olympic cyclists of Yugoslavia
Cyclists at the 1984 Summer Olympics
Sportspeople from Ljubljana
Slovenian male cyclists